Alberto Rivolta (4 November 1967 – 3 November 2019) was an Italian professional footballer who played as a defender. He was a member of the Internazionale team that won the 1988–89 Serie A title, making one 12-minute appearance in the penultimate away game of the season against Torino. However, injuries and loss of form forced him into an early retirement by 1992 at the age of just 24. In 1994, he was diagnosed with ependymoma, an illness that would eventually cause his death in 2019. He also played for Parma, Livorno and Seregno. Internationally, he was a member of the Italian under-20 squad at the 1987 FIFA World Youth Championship.

Honours
 Serie A champions: 1988–89

References

1967 births
2019 deaths
U.S. Livorno 1915 players
Association football defenders
Inter Milan players
Italian footballers
Italy youth international footballers
Parma Calcio 1913 players
Serie A players
Serie B players
U.S. 1913 Seregno Calcio players
People from Lissone